The EuroGames are an LGBT multi-sport event in Europe, licensed by the European Gay and Lesbian Sport Federation to a local city host each year and organised (most often) by one or more of the federation's member clubs. Similar to the Gay Games, EuroGames are a sports-for-all event, open for participation irrespective of sex, age, sexual identity or physical ability. It ranges in scale from 1,5 to cca 4 thousand or even more participants, most often with extra Outreach support subsidies for less privileged participants.

Scheduling
The EuroGames is most often a weekend event with opening ceremonies, some of the sport, social and cultural activities (as side program) also happening on the days before.

History

See also 

 Europride
 Gay Games / Federation of Gay Games
 Principle 6 campaign
 World Outgames / Gay and Lesbian International Sport Association
 WorldPride

References

External links 
 

 European Gay And Lesbian Sport Federation
 Archive of QueerSport.org - first European Gay And Lesbian Sports Guide

LGBT sports events
Recurring sporting events established in 1992
European international sports competitions
Multi-sport events in Europe